Dobré is a municipality and village in Rychnov nad Kněžnou District in the Hradec Králové Region of the Czech Republic. It has about 800 inhabitants.

Administrative parts
Villages of Chmeliště, Hlinné, Kamenice, Rovné and Šediviny are administrative parts of Dobré.

History
The first written mention about Dobré is from 1367. It was founded during the colonization of forests in the 12th and 13th centuries.

Notable people
Zdeněk Kárník (1931–2011), historian

Gallery

References

Villages in Rychnov nad Kněžnou District